Vytegra may refer to:

Vytegra, a town in Vytegorsky District of Vologda Oblast, Russia
Vytegra Urban Settlement, a municipal formation into which the town of district significance of Vytegra in Vytegorsky District of Vologda Oblast, Russia is incorporated
Vytegra (river), a river in Vologda Oblast, Russia

See also
Vytegorsky District